Palmitoylethanolamide (PEA) is an endogenous fatty acid amide, and lipid modulator  PEA has been studied in in vitro and in vivo systems using exogenously added or dosed compound; there is evidence that it binds to a nuclear receptor, through which it exerts a variety of biological effects, some related to chronic inflammation and pain.

A main target of PEA is proposed to be the peroxisome proliferator-activated receptor alpha (PPAR-α). PEA also has affinity to cannabinoid-like G-coupled receptors GPR55 and GPR119. PEA cannot strictly be considered a classic endocannabinoid because it lacks affinity for the cannabinoid receptors CB1 and CB2. However, primary research supports the conclusion that the presence of PEA (or other structurally related N-acylethanolamines) enhances anandamide activity by an "entourage effect".

Some primary research reports support the conclusion that PEA levels are altered and that the endocannabinoid system (ECS) is "imbalanced" in acute and chronic inflammation. A primary research article, for instance, has reported that the deregulation of cannabinoid receptors and their endogenous ligands accompanies the development and progression of β-amyloid-induced neuroinflammation.

In some primary research studies, PEA has been shown to have anti-inflammatory, anti-nociceptive, neuroprotective, and anticonvulsant properties.

Early and recent studies

Palmitoylethanolamide was discovered in 1957. Indications for its use as an anti-inflammatory and analgesic date from before 1980. In that year, researchers described what they called "N-(2-hydroxyethyl)-palmitamide" as a natural anti-inflammatory agent, stating, "We have succeeded in isolating a crystalline anti-inflammatory factor from soybean lecithin and identifying it as (S)-(2-hydroxyethyl)-palmitamide. The compound also was isolated from a phospholipid fraction of egg yolk and from hexane-extracted peanut meal."

In 1975, Czech physicians described the results of a clinical trial looking at  joint pain, where the analgesic action of aspirin versus PEA were tested; both drugs were reported to enhance joint movements and decrease pain. In 1970 the drug manufacturer Spofa in Czechoslovakia introduced Impulsin, a tablet dose of PEA, for the treatment and prophylaxis of influenza and other respiratory infections. In Spain, the company Almirall introduced Palmidrol in tablet and suspension forms in 1976, for the same indications. 

In the mid-1990s, the relationship between anandamide and PEA was described; the expression of mast cell receptors sensitive to the two molecules was demonstrated by Levi-Montalcini and coworkers. During this period, more insight into the functions of endogenous fatty acid derivatives emerged, and compounds such as oleamide, palmitoylethanolamide, 2-lineoylglycerol and 2-palmitoylglycerol were explored for their capacity to modulate pain sensitivity and inflammation via what at that time was thought to be the endocannabinoid signalling pathway.

Primary reports also have provided evidence that PEA downregulates hyperactive mast cells in a dose-dependent manner, and that it alleviates pain elicited in mouse models. PEA and related compounds such as anandamide also seem to have synergistic effects in models of pain and analgesia.

Animal models
In a variety of animal models, PEA seems to have some promise; researchers have been able to demonstrate relevant clinical efficacy in a variety of disorders, from multiple sclerosis to neuropathic pain.

In the mouse forced swimming test, palmitoylethanolamide was comparable to fluoxetine for depression. An Italian study published in 2011 found that PEA reduced the raised intraocular pressure of glaucoma. In a spinal trauma model, PEA reduced the resulting neurological deficit via the reduction of mast cell infiltration and activation. PEA in this model also reduced the activation of microglia and astrocytes. Its activity as an inhibitor of inflammation counteracts reactive astrogliosis induced by beta-amyloid peptide, in a model relevant for neurodegeneration, probably via the PPAR-α mechanism of action. In models of stroke and other CNS trauma, PEA exerted neuroprotective properties.

Animal models of chronic pain and inflammation
Chronic pain and neuropathic pain are indications for which there is high unmet need in the clinic. PEA has been tested in a variety of animal models for chronic and neuropathic pain, because cannabinoids, such as THC, have been proven to be effective in neuropathic pain states. The analgesic and antihyperalgesic effects of PEA in two models of acute and persistent pain seemed to be explained at least partly via the de novo neurosteroid synthesis. In chronic granulomatous pain and inflammation model, PEA could prevent nerve formation and sprouting, mechanical allodynia, and PEA inhibited dorsal root ganglia activation, which is a hallmark for winding up in neuropathic pain. The mechanism of action of PEA as an analgesic and anti-inflammatory molecule is probably based on different aspects. PEA inhibits the release of both preformed and newly synthesised mast cell mediators, such as histamine and TNF-alpha. PEA, as well as its analogue adelmidrol (di-amide derivative of azelaic acid), can both down-regulate mast cells. PEA reduces the expression of cyclooxygenase-2 (COX-2) and inducible nitric oxide synthase (iNOS) and prevents IkB-alpha degradation and p65 NF-kappaB nuclear translocation, the latter related to PEA as an endogenous PPAR-alpha agonist.
In 2012 it became clear that PEA can also reduce reperfusion injury and the negative impact of shock on various outcome parameters, such as renal dysfunction, ischemic injury and inflammation, most probably via the PPAR-alpha pathway. Among the reperfusion and inflammation markers measured PEA could reduce the increase in creatinine, γGT, AST, nuclear translocation of NF-κBp65; kidney MPO activity and MDA levels, nitrotyrosine, PAR and adhesion molecules expression, the infiltration and activation of mast cells and apoptosis.

The biological responses to PEA dosing in animal models and in humans are being investigated vis-à-vis its involvement in a repair mechanism relevant to patient conditions of chronic inflammation and chronic pain. In a model of visceral pain (inflammation of the urinary bladder) PEA was able to attenuate the viscero-visceral hyper-reflexia induced by inflammation of the urinary bladder, one of the reasons why PEA is currently explored in the painful bladder syndrome. In a different model for bladder pain, the turpentine-induced urinary bladder inflammation in the rat, PEA also attenuated a referred hyperalgesia in a dose-dependent way. Chronic pelvic pain in patients seem to respond favourably to a treatment with PEA.

Activity in non-neuronal cells

PEA, as an N-acylethanolamine, has physico-chemical properties comparable to anandamide, and, while it is not strictly an endocannabinoid, it is often studied in conjunction with anandamide because of their overlapping synthetic and metabolic pathways. N-acylethanolamines such as PEA often act as signaling molecules, activating receptors and regulating a variety of physiological functions. PEA is known to activate intracellular, nuclear and membrane-associated receptors, and to regulate many physiological functions related to the inflammatory cascade and chronic pain states. Endocannabinoid lipids like PEA are widely distributed in nature, in a variety of plant, invertebrate, and mammalian tissues.

PEA's mechanism of action sometimes is described as Autacoid Local Injury Antagonism (acronym ALIA), and PEA under this nomenclature is an ALIAmide. Levi-Montalcini and coworkers presented evidence in 1993 that lipid amides of the N-acylethanolamine type, such as PEA, are potential prototypes of naturally occurring molecules capable of modulating mast cell activation, and her group used the acronym ALIA in that report. An autocoid is a regulating molecule, locally produced. An ALIAmide is an autocoid synthesized on-demand in response to injury, and acts locally to counteract such pathology. Soon after the breakthrough paper of Levi-Montalcini, the mast cell appeared to be an important target for the anti-inflammatory activity of PEA. Since 1993, at least 25 papers have been published on the various effects of PEA on mast cells. These cells are often found in proximity to sensory nerve endings, and their degranulation can enhance the nociceptive signal, the reason why peripheral mast cells are considered to be pro-inflammatory and pro-nociceptive. PEA's activity is currently seen as a new inroad in the treatment of neuropathic pain and related disorders based on overactivation of glia and glia-related cells, such as in diabetes and glaucoma. Microglia plays a key role in the winding up phenomena and central sensitization.

Clinical relevance
Effects of oral dosing of PEA has been explored in humans, and include clinical trials for a variety of pain states, for inflammatory and pain syndromes. Daily doses range from 300 to 1200 mg per day. In a 2017 systematic meta-analysis involving 10 studies including data from 786 patients receiving PEA for pain-related indications and 512 controls, PEA was found to be associated with pain reduction significantly greater than observed in controls (P < 0.001). Positive influences have also been observed in dermal applications, specifically atopic eczema, which may be linked to PPAR alpha activation. 

In a 2015 analysis of a double blind placebo controlled study of PEA in sciatic pain, the Numbers Needed to Treat was 1.5. Its positive influence in chronic pain, and inflammatory states such as atopic eczema, seems to originate mainly from PPAR alpha activation. Since 2012 a number of new trials have been published, among which studies in glaucoma. PEA also seems to be one of the factors responsible for the decrease in pain sensitivity during and after sport, comparable to the endogenous opiates (endorphines).

From a clinical perspective the most important and promising indications for PEA are linked to neuropathic and chronic pain states, such as diabetic neuropathic pain, sciatic pain, CRPS, pelvic pain and entrapment neuropathic pain states. In a blind trial reported in a conference proceeding, patients affected by pain from synovitis or TMJ osteoarthritis (N=25, in total) were randomly assigned to PEA or ibuprofen groups for two weeks; the decrease in pain reported after two weeks was significantly higher for the PEA-treated group, likewise for improved masticatory function. In 2012, 20 patients with thalidomide and bortezomib induced neuropathy were reported to have improved nerve functions and less pain after a two-month treatment with PEA. The authors pointed out that although a placebo effect might play a role in the reported pain relief, the changes in neurophysiological measures clearly indicated that PEA exerted a positive action on the myelinated fibre groups. Sixteen men and fourteen women with two major types of neuropathic pain refractory to analgesic treatment—peripheral diabetic neuropathy (4 men, 7 women) or post-herpetic neuralgia (12 men, 7 women)—whose symptoms spanned eight pain categories ("burning", "osteoarticular", "piercing", etc.) who were under prior treatment with pregabalin were transferred to PEA, after which pregabalin treatment was gradually reintroduced; all were responding well after 45 days, and presented significant decreases in pain scores (without drug-drug interactions).

In 2013, a metareview was published on the clinical efficacy and safety of PEA in the treatment of the common cold and influenza, based on reports from six double-blind, placebo, randomized controlled trials, addressing PEA's proposed anti-inflammatory and retinoprotectant effects.

In 2019, significant increases in fatty acid amides including PEA, arachidonoylethanolamide, and oleoylethanolamide were noted in a Scottish woman with a previously undocumented variant of congenital insensitivity to pain. This was found to be a result of  a combination of a hypomorphic single nucleotide polymorphism of fatty acid amide hydrolase (FAAH), alongside a mutation of the pseudogene, FAAH-OUT. The pseudogene was previously considered to be non-coding DNA, FAAH-OUT was found to be capable of modulating the expression of FAAH, making it a possible future target for novel analgesia/anxiolytic drug development.

In 2020, PEA has been suggested as a drug that may prove beneficial for the treatment of lung inflammation caused by SARS-CoV-2 infection. A pharmaceutical company called FSD Pharma have entered PEA into a Phase 1 clinical trial under the name FSD-201, and has approval from the FDA for progressing to Phase 2a for this indication.

Metabolism
PEA is metabolized by the cellular enzymes fatty acid amide hydrolase (FAAH) and N-acylethanolamine acid amide hydrolase (NAAA), the latter of which has more specificity toward PEA over other fatty acid amides.

Safety
PEA is generally considered safe, and without adverse drug reactions (ADRs) or drug interactions. A 2016 study assessing safety claims in sixteen clinical trials, six case reports/pilot studies and a meta‐analysis of PEA as an analgesic, concluded that for treatment periods up to 49 days, clinical data argued against serious ADRs at an incidence of 1/200 or greater. A 2016 pooled meta-analysis involving twelve studies found that no serious ADRs were registered and/or reported. No data on interactions with PEA have been reported. Based on its mechanism, PEA may be considered likely to interact with other PPAR-α agonists used to treat high triglycerides; this remains unconfirmed.

See also 
 N-Acylethanolamine
 N-Acylphosphatidylethanolamine

References

Further reading 

 
 
 
 
 
 
  
 

Biomolecules
Lipids
Fatty acid amides
Endocannabinoids